Bailando 2015 is the tenth season of Argentine TV dance competition Bailando por un Sueño. The season premiere was aired on May 11, 2015, and was hosted by Marcelo Tinelli.

In this season the jury consisted of five returning judges: Nacha Guevara, Moria Casán, Soledad Silveyra, and Marcelo Polino and newcomer Ángel de Brito.

Couples
{| class="wikitable" style="text-align: center; margin:auto; font-size:95%;"
|-
!width="220"|Celebrity
!width="180"|Professional Partner or Celebrity
!width="130"|Status 
!width="40" class="unsortable" | 
|-
|
|
|style="background:#f4c7b8;"|
|
|-
|
|
|style="background:lightgreen;"|
|
|-
|
|
|style="background:#f4c7b8;"|
|
|-
|
|
| style="background:lightgreen;"|
|
|-
|
|
|style="background:#f4c7b8;"|
|
|-
|
|
|style="background:#f4c7b8;"|
|
|-
|
|
|style="background:#f4c7b8;"|
|
|-
|
|
|style="background:#f4c7b8;"|
|
|-
|
|
|style="background:#f4c7b8;"|
|
|-
|
|
|style="background:#f4c7b8;"|
|
|-
|
|
|style="background:lightgreen;"|
|
|-
|
|
|style="background:#f4c7b8"|
|
|-
|
|
|style="background:#f4c7b8;"|
|
|-
|
|
|style="background:#f4c7b8;"|
|
|-
|
|
|style="background:#f4c7b8;"|
|
|-
|
|
|style="background:#f4c7b8;"|
|
|-
|
|
|style="background:#f4c7b8;"|
|
|-
|
|
|style="background:#f4c7b8;"|
|
|-
|
|
|style="background:#f4c7b8;"|
|
|-
|
|
|style="background:#f4c7b8;"|
|
|- 
|
|
|style="background:#f4c7b8;"|
|
|-
|
|
|style="background:#f4c7b8;"|
|
|-
|
|
|style="background:#f4c7b8;"|
|
|-
|
|
| style="background:tan;"|
|
|-
|
|
| style="background:tan;"|
|
|-
|
|
| style="background:silver;"|
|
|-
|style="background:lavender;"|
|style="background:lavender;"|
|style="background:gold;"|{{center|Winners}}
|
|}

Scoring chart

Red numbers Indicate the lowest score for each week.
Green numbers Indicate the highest score for each week.
 Indicates the couple sentenced.
 Indicates the couple was saved by the judges.
 Indicates the couple was saved by the public.
 indicates the couple was saved by production.
 Indicates the couple eliminated that week.
 Indicates the couple withdrew.
 Indicates that the couple was disqualified by decision of production.
 Indicates the winning couple.
 Indicates the runner-up couple.
 Indicates the semifinalists couples.

 (*) In round 14, Luciana Salazar could not dance due to injury.

 Highest and lowest scoring performances 
The best and worst performances in each dance according to the judges' marks are as follows:

Styles, scores and songs
Individual judges' scores in the charts below are listed in this order from left to right: Ángel de Brito, Nacha Guevara, Moria Casán, Soledad Silveyra, Marcelo Polino.
 Secret vote is in bold text.

 Week 1 

      Sentenced: Gladys Florimonte (18), Alberto Samid (21), Marcela Tauro (21), Ailén Bechara (21), Fernando Burlando & Bárbara Franco (21), Agustina Kämpfer (23)      Saved by the jury: Ailén Bechara, Fernando Burlando & Bárbara Franco, Marcela Tauro, Agustina Kämpfer
      Saved by the public: Alberto Samid (54.25%)      Eliminated: Gladys Florimonte (45.75%) Week 2 

      Sentenced: Luciano "Tirri" Giugno & Noelia Marzol (12), Nito Artaza & Silvina Scheffler (23), Verónica Ojeda (27), Ergün Demir (27), Marcela Tauro (27)      Saved by production: Luciano "Tirri" Giugno & Noelia Marzol, Nito Artaza & Silvina Scheffler, Verónica Ojeda, Ergün Demir, Marcela Tauro
      Withdrew: Anita Martínez & Marcos "Bicho" Gómez

 Week 3 

      Sentenced: Luciano "Tirri" Giugno & Noelia Marzol (21), Agustina Kämpfer (21), Bárbara Vélez (23), Carlos "Negro" Álvarez (23), Marcela Tauro (27)      Saved by the jury: Bárbara Vélez, Marcela Tauro, Luciano Tirri & Noelia Marzol
      Saved by the public: Carlos "Negro" Álvarez (56.85%)      Eliminated: Agustina Kämpfer (43.15%) Week 4 

      Sentenced: Alberto Samid (19), Ailén Bechara (24), Carmen Barbieri (24), Nazarena Vélez (24), Marcela Tauro (28)      Saved by the jury: Nazarena Vélez, Ailén Bechara, Carmen Barbieri
      Saved by the public: Alberto Samid (56.79%)      Eliminated: Marcela Tauro (43.21%)      Withdrew: Carlos "Negro" Álvarez

 Week 5 

      Saved by the jury: Martín Campilongo, Nito Artaza, Federico Bal & Laura Fernández, Verónica Ojeda, Ailén Bechara, Florencia de la V , Bárbara Vélez
      Saved by the public: Ergün Demir (75.03%)      Eliminated: Luciano "Tirri" Giugno & Noelia Marzol (24.97%) Week 6 

      Saved by the jury: Fernando Dente & Lourdes Sánchez, Cinthia Fernandez, Ailén Bechara, Nazarena Vélez, Fernando Burlando & Bárbara Franco 
      Saved by the public: Verónica Ojeda (57.13%)      Eliminated: Alberto Samid (42.87%) Week 7 

      Saved by the jury: Nito Artaza & Silvina Scheffler, Candela Ruggeri, Ergün Demir, Celeste Muriega, Nazarena Vélez
      Saved by the public: Bárbara Vélez (50.62%)      Eliminated: Verónica Ojeda (49.38%) Week 8 

      Saved by the jury: Candela Ruggeri, Bárbara Vélez, Ailén Bechara, Lizy Tagliani, Nazarena Vélez
      Saved by the public: Carmen Barbieri (62.65%)      Eliminated: Nito Artaza & Silvina Scheffler (37.35%) Week 9 

      Saved by the jury: Ergün Demir, Freddy Villarreal, Bárbara Vélez, Martín Campilongo, Ailén Bechara
      Saved by the public: Carmen Barbieri (58.23%)      Eliminated: Nazarena Velez (41.77%) Week 10 

      Saved by the jury: Bárbara Vélez, Federico Bal & Laura Fernández, Juana Viale, Ergün Demir 
      Saved by the public: Martín Campilongo (54.72%)      Eliminated: Florencia de la V (45.28%)      Withdrew: Carmen Barbieri

 Week 11 

      Saved by the jury: Celeste Muriega, Freddy Villarreal, Bárbara Vélez, Martín Campilongo, Ergün Demir
      Saved by the public: Ailén Bechara (67.42%)      Eliminated: Fernando Burlando & Bárbara Franco (32.58%) Week 12 

      Saved by the jury: Fernando Dente & Lourdes Sánchez, Federico Bal & Laura Fernandez, Candela Ruggeri, Ailen Bechara, Lizy Tigliani
      Saved by the public: Celeste Muriega (52.05%)      Eliminated: Juana Viale (47.95%) Week 13 

      Saved by the jury: Gisela Bernal, Fernando Dente & Lourdes Sánchez, Ailén Bechara, Federico Bal & Laura Fernandez, Martín Campilongo
      Saved by the public: Ergün Demir (56.09%)      Eliminated: Lizy Tagliani (43.91%) Week 14 

      Saved by the jury: Candela Ruggeri, Martín Campilongo, Ailén Bechara, Freddy Villarreal, Ergün Demir
      Saved by the public: Bárbara Vélez (55.02%)      Eliminated: Luciana Salazar (44.98%) Week 15 

      Saved by the jury: Federico Bal & Laura Fernandez, Ergün Demir
      Saved by the public: Ailén Bechara (56.53%)      Eliminated: Candela Ruggeri (43.47%) Week 16 

      Saved by the jury: Cinthia Fernandez, Celeste Muriega, Freddy Villarreal, Ergün Demir
      Saved by the public: Martín Campilongo (58.40%)      Eliminated: Bárbara Vélez (41.60%) Week 17 

      Saved by the jury: Celeste Muriega 
      Saved by the public: Ailén Bechara (52.28%)      Eliminated: Ergün Demir (47.72%) Week 18 

      Saved by the jury: Cinthia Fernandez, Fernando Dente & Lourdes Sánchez, Gisela Bernal, Ailén Bechara
      Saved by the public: Freddy Villarreal (59.47%)      Eliminated: Celeste Muriega (40.43%) Week 19  

      Saved by the jury: Freddy Villareal
      Saved by the public: Ailén Bechara (56.45%)      Eliminated: Martín Campilongo  (43.55%) Week 20  

 Merengue 

 Street Pop 

      Saved by the jury: Gisela Bernal, Cinthia Fernández, Federico Bal & Laura Fernández
      Saved by the public: Ailén Bechara (54.21%)      Eliminated: Freddy Villareal (45.79%) Week 21 

      Saved by the jury: Gisela Bernal, Cinthia Fernández, Ailén Bechara
      Saved by the public: Federico Bal (56.95%)      Eliminated: Fernando Dente (43.05%) Semifinal 1 - Reggaeton / Tango or Milonga / Cuarteto / Adagio Notes::The point is for the couple.
:The point is not for the couple.Result:      Finalist: Federico Bal & Laura Fernández
      Semifinalist: Gisela Bernal

 Semifinal 2 - Cumbia / Disco / Latin pop / VideoClip Notes::The point is for the couple.
:The point is not for the couple.Result:      Finalist: Ailén Bechara 
      Semifinalist: Cinthia Fernández

 Final - Ballet / Bachata / Merengue / Freestyle II Notes::The point is for the couple.
:The point is not for the couple.Result:      Winners: Federico Bal & Laura Fernández
      Runners-up:''' Ailén Bechara

References

Argentina
Argentine variety television shows
2015 Argentine television seasons